Marsden is an English surname. Notable people with the surname include:

People

Performers
 Bernie Marsden (born 1951), English rock guitarist
 Betty Marsden (1919–1998), British comedy actress
 Gerry Marsden (1942–2021), British musician
 James Marsden (born 1973), American actor
 Jason Marsden (born 1975), American screen and voice actor
 Matthew Marsden, (born 1973), English actor
 Midge Marsden, (born 1945), New Zealand musician
 Roy Marsden (born 1941), British actor who played detective Dalgliesh on television

Politicians
 David W. Marsden (born 1948), American politician
 Frank Marsden  (1923–2006), British politician
 Gordon Marsden (born 1953), British politician
 Henry Rowland Marsden (1823–1876), mayor of Leeds and philanthropist
 Lorna Marsden, (born 1942), Canadian sociologist and senator

Other
 Alison Marsden, American bioengineer
 Brian G. Marsden (1937–2010), British astronomer
 Chris Marsden (born 1969), football player
 David Marsden, Canadian radio broadcaster
 Dora Marsden (1882–1960), author
 Edgar Marsden (1919–2010), Trinidad cricketer
 Edward Marsden (1869–1932), Canadian-American missionary
 Ernest Marsden (1889–1970), British-New Zealand physicist
 George Marsden (born 1939), American historian
 Jerrold E. Marsden (1942–2010), mathematician
 Jill Marsden (scholar) (born 1964), philosopher
 John Howard Marsden (1803–1870), English antiquary and vicar
 John Marsden (footballer) (born 1992), English footballer
 John Marsden (lawyer) (1942-2006), Australian solicitor
 John Marsden (rower) (1915–2004), English rower, intelligence officer and teacher
 John Marsden (rugby league) (born 1953), English rugby player
 John Marsden (writer) (born 1950), Australian writer of books for children and young adults
 Karen Marsden (born 1962), Australian field hockey player
 Pat Marsden (1936–2006), Canadian sportscaster
 Paul Marsden (born 1968), British politician
 Philip Marsden (born 1961), British author
 Rachel Marsden (born 1974), Canadian political commentator and activist
 Rhodri Marsden (born 1971), London-based journalist, musician, and blogger
 Samuel Marsden (1764–1838), Anglican priest 
 Samuel Marsden (bishop) (1832–1912), Anglican bishop
 Simon Marsden (1948-2012), English photographer
 Victor E. Marsden (1866-1920), journalist and translator
 William Marsden (footballer, born 1871) (1871–1943), English footballer
 William Marsden (orientalist) (1754–1836), English orientalist
 William Marsden (surgeon) (1796–1867), English surgeon

Fictional characters
 Elaine Marsden, fictional character
 Frances Marsden, fictional character
 Jill Marsden (EastEnders), fictional character
 Paul Marsden (Emmerdale), fictional character
 Ronnie Marsden, fictional character
 Siobhan Marsden, fictional character

English-language surnames